This article displays the qualifying draw of the 2011 Baku Cup.

Players

Seeds

  Irini Georgatou (qualified)
  Jasmina Tinjić (second round)
  Valeria Solovieva (qualified)
  Elena Bovina (qualified)
  Tatia Mikadze (qualifying competition) (lucky loser)
  Yana Buchina (qualified)
  Dalila Jakupovič (qualifying competition)
  Daniella Dominikovic (second round)

Qualifiers

  Irini Georgatou
  Yana Buchina
  Valeria Solovieva
  Elena Bovina

Qualifying draw

First qualifier

Second qualifier

Third qualifier

Fourth qualifier

References
 Qualifying Draw

2011 - qualifying
Baku Cup - qualifying